GUBA Enterprise

Grow, Unite, Build, Africa (GUBA) Enterprise formerly known as the Ghana UK Based Achievement is a social enterprise organization dedicated to the advancement of diaspora Africans and Africans back home through various socio-economic programs and initiatives.

GUBA’s objectives are to support businesses to (Grow), Provide an engaging network to (Unite) people of African descent, and offer access to skills capital to (Build) businesses of African descent.

The enterprise consists of several branches which include: GUBA Awards, GUBA Foundation, GUBA Trade Expo, GUBA Careers, GUBA Diaspora Card, Rock Your African Print, GUBA Tours, and the Diaspora Transition Network.

GUBA Awards

Grow, Unite, Build, Africa (GUBA) Awards is a non-profit Pan-African, Business and Innovation Award instituted to seek to reward, and celebrate the excellence and innovation of African individuals and organizations in the diaspora and back home, that work towards the advancement, empowerment, and progression of the African community in the Diaspora.[1]

GUBA Awards started as an annual awards ceremony based in Britain that recognized the "hugely significant" contribution that British-Ghanaians make to society. The awards were founded in 2009 by UK-based Ghanaian TV personality Dentaa, with the first awards ceremony taking place in London, England, in October 2010. [2] GUBA President Dentaa had the idea to set up the awards as she felt that “nothing out there” promoted and celebrated the hard work and successes of British Ghanaians. [3]

The GUBA Awards was the first ceremony of its kind to specifically recognize Ghanaian achievement and the only awards to be endorsed by the Ghana High Commission in the UK and the British High Commission in Ghana.[4] More recently, the organizers have sought to also involve the wider African communities as they attempt to gain international attention. The GUBA Awards ceremony attracts a high caliber of African political luminaries as well as business and entrepreneurial personalities. [5] [6]

In July 2013, the GUBA Awards received an International Corporate Social Responsibility (CSR) Excellence Award, beating over 100 nominees from the UK corporate sector. The organization won silver in the 'International' category of the awards for its work supporting and enriching British-

Organisation  
Categories in the GUBA Awards are divided into sections that represent the Ghanaian Flag: Red (Business & Enterprise); Gold (Popular Culture); Green (Community) and Black Star (Recognition Awards).

Hundreds of recommendations for nominees are received each year. A vetting process is in place along with a clear criterion that each candidate has to satisfy prior to being accepted as a nominee. Only the activities of the candidates in the 12 months leading up to the awards are considered, so that everyone stands a fair chance.

A panel of judges who are prominent members of the Ghanaian community is responsible for compiling the final short-list of nominees. In both the 2010 and 2011 GUBA Awards there were three judges: Charles Thompson MBE (CEO of the Screen Nation Awards), singer Rhian Benson and solicitor Maame Biama Asante. For the 2012 awards there are four judges: Thompson, Mavis Amankwah (managing director of communications firm Rich Visions), Freddy Annan (CEO for BASE Management Group) and Sandra Teichman (a director in the London arm of US law firm Pillsbury Winthrop Shaw Pittman).

For the GUBA Awards 2013, there are 11 award categories: Business of the Year; IIA Sustainability Award; Efie Ne Fie Award; Young Entrepreneur of the Year; Rising Star of the Year; Fashion Fusion Designer of the Year; Music Act of the Year; Ghanaian Association of the Year; Inspirational Personality of the Year; Unsung Hero of the Year; and Charity of The Year. The winners will be announced at a black-tie event in central London, to be held on 16 November 2013.

With the exception of the Recognition Awards category, the winners in each section are decided by public vote and announced at the awards ceremony.

Directional Shift 
2019 marked a monumental moment for the GUBA Awards, with the awards being held for the first time in the United States. The awards were held in New York alongside the 74th UN General Assembly, which saw a change in direction of the awards’ scope.

It was important to put the spotlight on the pantheon community, recognize them for their efforts, and encourage them to promote growth and innovation in Africa and the rest of the world. This informed the decision to widen the scope of the awards, to focus on a more Pan-African approach.

The United States edition of the GUBA Awards was held under the theme, ‘African Diaspora, the Catalyst for Growth and Innovation’. [1]

In 2021, the awards were held in Ghana for the first time since its inception to celebrate the

centenary of the death of Ghanaian historical warrior and hero – Nana Yaa Asantewaa.[2]
[1] GUBA Awards Comes Stateside With Event At Pierre Hotel https://www.blackenterprise.com/guba-awards-comes-to-america/#:~:text=The%20international%2C%20world%2Drenowned%20GUBA,Hotel%20on%20September%2026%2C%202019.

[2] GUBA award’s decision to celebrate Yaa Asantewaa appropriate, says Akufo-Addo - https://asaaseradio.com/guba-awards-decision-to-celebrate-yaa-asantewaa-appropriate-says-akufo-addo/

GUBA Awards 2010 winners 
Reference:
Best Business – Kumasi Market
Best Entrepreneur/Innovator – Arnold Sarfo Kantanka: Me FiRi Ghana
Best African Fusion Designer – Ohema Ohene
Best Hair & Beauty – Josh Hair & Beauty
Best Restaurant – The Gold Coast
Best Shipping Company – Speedlink
Best DJ – Teddy Abrokwa
Best Radio Station – Rainbow Radio
Best TV Programming – The World's Strictest Parents
Best Media Personality – Ama K. Abebrese
Best Sports Personality – John Mensah
Best Event – Ghana Party in the Park
Best Musician – Sonnie Badu
Best Association – GNA
Best Rising Star Award – Belinda Owusu
Best Student Ahiever – Karen Boadu
Pioneer Award – Leticia Obeng
Recognition Award – Black Stars
Lifetime Achievement Award – Osibisa

GUBA Awards 2011 winners 
Reference:
Best Business – Tullow Oil
Best Money Transfer – MoneyGram
Best Shipping Company – Speedlink Travel and Freight
Best Professional – Lady Gifty Tetteh
Best Entrepreneur – Andy Ansah
Best African Fusion – Yaa Ataa Couture Bags
Best Radio Presenter – Owusu Frimpong
Best Club DJ – Neptizzle
Best Photographer – Ernest Simons
Best Print Journalist – Joanna Abeyie
Best African Sports Personality – Asamoah Gyan
Best Charity Organisation – Ghana Education Project
Best Association – Ghanaian Community in Bradford
Rising Star Award – Fidel Frimpong
Best Student Achiever – Vida Yiadom Boayke
Special Achievement Award – Coz Ov Moni – First pidgin musical
Special Achievement – James Barnor – 50-year photography career
Special Achievement – Kwami Sefa Kayi – Popular running morning show in Ghana / 11 years
Special Achievement – Samuel Awuni – Cocoa Farmer
Lifetime Achievement – Lord Paul Boateng

GUBA Awards 2012 winners 
Reference:

Red – Business & Enterprise
Ghana High Commission Award for Best Corporate Business – Armajaro Trading
Best Professional – John Blavo (Blavo & Co)
Efie Ne Fie (Home is Home) – Gloria Buckman Yankson (Plan It Ghana)
Gold – Popular Culture
Best African Fusion Designer – Anita Quansah London – Anita Quansah
Best Creative Writer – Dorothy Koomson
Best Online Media – My Joy online
Best Emerging Music Act – Mista Silver
Green – Community
Best Ghanaian Event -
All White Party – Ghana Party in the Park (Akwaaba Promotions)
Best Charity Organisation – WAM (What About Me) Campaign
Rising Stars Award – Philomena Kwao
GUBA Humanitarian – James Annan (Challenging Height)
GUBA Community Champion – Lorraine Wright
Black – Recognition Awards
Best Student Achiever – Gillian Appau
International Recognition Award – Patrick Quarcoo (Kenya based media mogul)
Inspirational African Award – Dr Mike Adebuga (Globacom)
Special Achievement Award – Sam Jonah (Executive Chairman, Jonah Capital)
Special Achievement Award – Sam Ankrah (Investment Broker)
Special Achievement Award – Roland Agambire (Entrepreneur and owner of RLG)
Special Achievement Award – Dennis Tawiah (Event Promotion Pioneer, CEO of Akwaaba Promotions)
Sporting Achievement – John Mensah
Posthumous Lifetime Achievement Award – (Shaun Campbell on behalf of) Arthur Wharton, the first professional black football player and the world 100 yard record holder.

GUBA Awards 2013 winners 
Reference:

Business & Enterprise
 Sustainable Business Award: Agro Mindset Organization (David Asiamah)
 Corporate Business of the Year: Vodafone
 RLG Development Award: Edward Amartey Tagoe
 Small emerging business award: Sheabutter Cottage
 Young entrepreneur award: Edwin Kwaku Broni-Mensah.
 Efie Ne fie award: Debra-Jane Nelson (founder of Think| Mahogany)
Entertainment & Arts
 Music Artist of the Year award: Fuse ODG.
 African Fashion Designer of the Year: Duaba Serwa
 Young and Talented Award:Lewis Appiagyei, aspiring Formula 1 'champion'
Community
 Rising star award: Rebecca Amissah
 Charity of the Year award: Lively minds, a charity that focuses on helping deprived children in rural areas in Ghana and in Eastern Uganda.
 Ghanaian association of the Year: Merceyside Associations of Ghanaians.
Special Achievement Awards
 GUBA Exceptional achievement: Herman Chinery-Hesse
 GUBA Outstanding Achievement: Prince Kofi Amoabeng
 GUBA Community Champion: Archbishop Kwaku Manson
 GUBA Enterprise Mogul: Kanya King MBE
 Student Achiever Award won by Jason Ochere, who graduated with 2.1 honours in Philosophy, Politics and Economics at the university of Manchester university.

GUBA Award 2015 winners 
Reference:

Black Star Awards
 Amma Asante – Pioneering Director
 Rev Kingsley Appeagyei – GUBA Benevolence Award
 Dr Osei Kwame – Enterprise Mogul
 Dr Anthony Pile – British Service to Ghana Award
 Henry Bonsu – Outstanding Journalist and Broadcast Personality
 Nana Kwame Bediako – Business Entrepreneur Award
 Azumah Nelson – Sporting Legend
 Dr Kwabena Duffuor – Exceptional Achievement Award
 Prof Edward Ayensu – Life Time Achievement Award
 Idris Elba – Entertainment Icon
 Dr Joyce Rosalind Aryee – Inspirational Woman Nathan
 Kwabena Adisi aka Bola Ray – Media and Entertainment Award
 Mrs Kwansema Dumor on behalf of Komla Dumor –
 Peniel Enchill – GUBA Artist Extraordinaire Awards
Voting Awards 2015
 Timothy Amadi – GUBA Young and Talented Award
 Daniel Amoateng – GUBA Humanitarian Award
 Bradley Poku-Amankwah – Best Student Achiever
 Vanessa Hagan – Runner Up: Best Student Achiever

GUBA Awards 2017 winners 
Reference:
 Ghanaian Alumni Award – Holy Child Past Students Association (HOPSA)
 Charity of the Year Award – Action Through Enterprise (ATE)
 Professional of the Year Award – Joshua Siaw
 Made in Ghana Award – Peini Skincare
 Efie Ne Fie Award – Vanetta & Vemilleon Ackah – Kiddie Garden Nursery International
 Business Start-up of the Year – Purete Nature
The GUBA Black Star Awardees
 Maidie Arkutu – Female Influential Leader Apostle
 Dr. Kwadwo Sarfo – Innovative Pioneer
 Anas Aremeyaw Anas – Exceptional Journalist
 Dr. Michael K. Obeng – Humanitarian Spirit
 Dr. Papa Kwesi Nduom – Excellence in Business, Ghana
 Mr & Mrs Mensah (Uncle John's Bakery) – Enterprising Business Award
 Dr. Kwaku Oteng – Outstanding Industrialist
 Dr. Kofi Amoa-Abban – Young Oil &Gas Entrepreneur
 Kelvin Doe – Young African Innovator
 Dr. Nii Dzani – Influential Economist
 Dr. Jason Sarfo-Annin – Student Achiever of the Year
 Mrs. Ivy Manly-Spain – Female Excellence in Oil and Gas Award
 Chris Hughton – Outstanding Achievement Award

See also

 List of Ghanaian awards

References

External links 
 GUBA Awards website

Awards established in 2009
British awards
Ghana–United Kingdom relations
2009 establishments in the United Kingdom